The 2010–11 season was Montrose’s fifth consecutive season in the Scottish Third Division, having been relegated from the Scottish Second Division at the end of the 1995–96 season. Montrose also competed in the Challenge Cup, League Cup and the Scottish Cup.

Summary
Montrose finished Eighth in the Third Division. They reached the first round of the Challenge Cup, the first round of the League Cup, and the fourth round of the Scottish Cup.

Management
The club were managed during season 2010–11 by Steven Tweed. On 21 March 2011, Tweed resigned for personal reasons, with Ray Farningham being appointed as interim manager. Farningham was appointed as permanent manager in April.

Results and fixtures

Third Division

Scottish Challenge Cup

Scottish League Cup

Scottish Cup

Player statistics

Squad 

|}

League table

References

Montrose
Montrose F.C. seasons